Kyline Nicole Aquino Alcantara Manga  (born September 3, 2002) is a Filipino actress, singer, dancer, host, and podcaster. Born in Ocampo, Camarines Sur, Alcantara began acting at age seven and made her television debut in Star Circle Quest: Search for the Next Kiddie Superstars (2010–2011), in which she was the first contestant to be eliminated.

Alcantara was a character actress in ABS-CBN television series during her time. Her first major role was of Arlene in the family drama Annaliza (2013–2014). Alcantara had her breakthrough with a villainous role in GMA Network's supernatural drama Kambal, Karibal (2017–2018), winning a PMPC Star Award for Television and earning an Asian Academy Creative Award nomination.

Early life
Kyline Nicole Aquino Alcantara Manga was born on September 3, 2002, in Ocampo, Camarines Sur, Philippines, to Rowena Alcantara and Salvador "Butch" Manga. She has brothers named Kent Adler and Robin Angelou, and her parents got separated when Alcantara was four before her parents reconciled 10 years later. Alcantara attended Saint Francis of Assisi College for her primary education and later attended Academy of Christian Excellence Montessori for two years of high school before moving into Exodus Elementary School.

Drawn to the Armed Forces of the Philippines' strength, Alcantara said she wanted to enlist in the military, a job they did not offer. At age seven, she gained attention from show business instead after participating in theatrical plays. Before auditioning as a cast member in Goin' Bulilit (2005–2019), Alcantara's family traveled to ABS-CBN Broadcasting Center in Diliman, Quezon City, where they arrived too late and noticed auditions had ended.

Career

Early roles in ABS-CBN (2010–16)
Alcantara made her television debut in the 2010 talent show Star Circle Quest: Search for the Next Kiddie Superstars, in which she qualified to the top ten before being the first contestant to be eliminated from the show. Despite losing, she was recruited at Star Magic in 2011. In 2013, Alcantara costarred opposite Andrea Brillantes in the remake of GMA Network's Anna Liza (1980–1985), titled Annaliza. At her audition for the show, she immediately secured the villainous role. In a 2020 retrospective, Alcantara said her craftsmanship influenced the show, having acting lessons from costars Zanjoe Marudo, Kaye Abad, Denise Laurel, and director Theodore Boborol. Her next supporting roles were Jessa Boborol in Pangako Sa 'Yo (2015–2016) and Chloe in Born for You (2016). Alcantara made her cinema debut with minor roles in 2015 films Hamog and Etiquette for Mistresses. Her Star Magic contract expired in 2017.

Breakthrough in GMA Network (2017–present)

With Alcantara's departure from ABS-CBN, she decided to transfer to GMA Network in October 2017 and appeared as Cheska De Villa, a villain, in the television series Kambal, Karibal (2017–2018). She initially auditioned for either of her minor or supporting roles in the series, especially that of a younger version of Teresa (Jean Garcia). When GMA Network executives discovered that Alcantara's acting was decent, they convinced her to return for her different role. Her costars in the series, including Bianca Umali, Miguel Tanfelix, Pauline Mendoza, and Jeric Gonzales, presented her with new acting experiences. Alcantara's performance, which won her a PMPC Star Award for Television and received her an Asian Academy Creative Award nomination, was lauded by viewers and proved to be her breakthrough role.

Alcantara cohosted two variety shows in 2018: Sunday PinaSaya and Studio 7, and released her debut album Kyline that September. In 2019, she portrayed Anna Sevilla / Elsa Dela Cruz, the daughter of Edward Sevilla (Marvin Agustin) and Belinda Lopez (Sunshine Dizon) who was previously suffered from amnesia, in the musical series Inagaw na Bituin. In preparation, Alcantara read scripts that were inherent and watched videos about acting. Her next film role was in Julius Alfonso's Black Lipstick (2019) alongside Migo Adecer, Manolo Pedrosa, and Kate Valdez. Rappler critic Oggs Cruz criticized the film's complicated, unfocused scope, describing it as "old-fashioned".

Alcantara cohosted alongside others, including Alden Richards and Julie Anne San Jose, in the variety show All-Out Sundays, which began airing in January 2020. She costarred in Bilangin ang Bituin sa Langit (2020–2021). Alcantara had two television series in 2021. She starred in the installment #Future of the anthology I Can See You, in which she played a depressive and enigmatic woman. I Left My Heart in Sorsogon, a romantic drama, was Alcantara's final series that year.

Public image and personal life
Francesca Testa of Mega took note of her energetic and "amusing personality". Krista Garcia of Preview.ph commented on her "determined optimism", identifying an extent of "typical carefree hopefulness" to her status and adding, "She's certain that her destiny is to be a big star, not because it has been handed to her, but because she knows that she will do whatever it takes to earn it."

Alcantara had difficulties with acne, missing roles, her family life, finances, and rejection from auditions. She is an ambassador for companies Converse and Ever Bilena, and agencies SOS Children's Villages and the Korea Tourism Organization (KTO). Alcantara's purpose of the KTO is to maintain South Korea a "top-of-mind tourist destination for Filipinos". She and fellow I Left My Heart in Sorsogon star Mavy Legaspi are in a relationship since December 2021.

Filmography

Television

Film

Podcast

Awards and nominations

Notes

References

External links
 
 

2002 births
Living people
Bicolano people
Actresses from Camarines Sur
Filipino television actresses
Filipino child actresses
Participants in Philippine reality television series
Star Circle Quest participants
ABS-CBN personalities
Star Magic personalities
GMA Network personalities
GMA Music artists
Women television personalities
Filipino women television presenters
Filipino television variety show hosts
21st-century Filipino women singers
Filipino podcasters